William Shortt Williamson (October 14, 1915 – May 15, 1991) was a Canadian canoeist who competed in the 1936 Summer Olympics.

In 1936 he finished 14th in the K-1 10000 m event.

References

Sports-reference.com profile

1915 births
1991 deaths
Canoeists at the 1936 Summer Olympics
Olympic canoeists of Canada